Tell Them Willie Boy Is Here is a 1969 American Western film based on the true story of a Chemehuevi–Paiute Native American named Willie Boy and his run-in with the law in 1909 in Banning, California, United States. 
The film is an adaptation of the 1960 book Willie Boy: A Desert Manhunt by Harry Lawton.

The film was written and directed by the once blacklisted Abraham Polonsky, who, due to his blacklisting, had not directed a film since Force of Evil in 1948.

Plot
The film's story revolves around the Paiute Native American outlaw Willie Boy (Robert Blake), who escapes with his lover, Lola (Katharine Ross), after killing her father in self defense. According to tribal custom Willie can then claim Lola as his wife. According to the law, Deputy Sheriff Cooper (Robert Redford) is required to charge him with murder.

Willie Boy and Lola are hunted for several days by a posse led by Cooper. Cooper is forced to turn back to work security for President Taft. Willie manages to repel the posse's advance when he ambushes them from the top of Ruby Mountain. He only tries to shoot their horses, but ends up accidentally killing a bounty hunter, resulting in another murder charge.

Days later, as the posse closes in, Lola dies by a gunshot wound to the chest. It is left deliberately ambiguous whether Lola shot herself so that she wouldn't slow Willie down or whether Willie killed her to keep her out of the posse's hands. Cooper is inclined to believe the latter and then goes off ahead of the posse to bring in Willie dead or alive. As soon as Cooper catches up, he comes under fire from Willie, who is positioned at the top of Ruby Mountain. Cooper narrowly avoids being shot on several occasions.

In the film's climax, Cooper maneuvers behind Willie, who has donned a ghost shirt, and tells him he can turn around if he wants to, which he does. The two pause before Willie raises his rifle at Cooper, who beats him to the draw and shoots him. Fatally struck in the chest, Willie tumbles down the hillside. Cooper picks up Willie's gun and finds that it wasn't even loaded, making it apparent that Willie deliberately chose death over capture. Abashed, Cooper carries the slain outlaw the rest of the way down Ruby Mountain and delivers him to other Paiutes, who carry the corpse away and burn the remains.

When confronted by the county sheriff, Cooper is told that the burning of Willie's body will ruin the people's chance to see Willie in the (now-dead) flesh, denying them the ability "to see something". Cooper retorts:  "Tell them we're all out of souvenirs".

Cast
 Robert Redford as Cooper
 Katharine Ross as Lola
 Robert Blake as Willie 
 Susan Clark as Liz
 Barry Sullivan as Calvert
 John Vernon as Hacker
 Charles Aidman as Benby
 Charles McGraw as Wilson
 Shelly Novack as Finney
 Robert Lipton as Newcombe
 Lloyd Gough as Dexter
 Ned Romero as Tom
 John Wheeler as Newman 
 Erik Holland as Digger (as Eric Holland)
 Garry Walberg as Dr. Mills
 Jerry Velasco as Chino
 George Tyne as Le Marie
 Lee de Broux as Meathead (as Lee De Broux)
 Wayne Sutherlin as Harry
 Jerome Raphael as Salesman (as Jerome Raphel)
 Lou Frizzell as Station Agent

History
As depicted in the movie, Willie Boy and Lola (her actual name was Carlota, though she was also called Isoleta and Lolita in various accounts) did run through the Morongo Valley. Carlota was found shot in the back in an area known as The Pipes in northwest Yucca Valley. Willie Boy was blamed for her death, but a 1994 book detailing Carlota's autopsy proved that the bullet had been shot from a long distance away, implicating the posse. Willie Boy did ambush the posse at Ruby Mountain, killing several horses and accidentally wounding a posse member. He ended his 'last stand' by suicide on the flanks of Ruby Mountain west of the current site of Landers, California.

The monument itself bears the inscription “The West’s Last Famous Manhunt”, alluding to the notion that this was the last effort of its type before the use of a posse was generally replaced by modern, 'fully' staffed and empowered law enforcement agencies.

Awards

See also
 List of American films of 1969
 Gilman Ranch

References

Further reading

External links
 
 
 
 
 Pictures of Willie Boy's monument and a map to the monument location

1969 films
1969 Western (genre) films
American Western (genre) films
1960s English-language films
1960s chase films
Films about Native Americans
Films based on non-fiction books
Films set in Riverside County, California
Films shot in California
Banning, California
Universal Pictures films
Films scored by Dave Grusin
Revisionist Western (genre) films
1960s American films